Katha Jori railway station is a railway station on Kharagpur–Puri line, part of the Howrah–Chennai main line under Khurda Road railway division of East Coast Railway zone. It is situated beside Badam Badi Road at Madhu Patna Colony, Cuttack in Cuttack district in the Indian state of Odisha.

History
In between 1893 and 1896 the East Coast State Railway constructed Howrah–Chennai main line. Kharagpur–Puri branch was finally opened for public in 1901. The route was electrified in several phases. In 2005, Howrah–Chennai route was completely electrified.

References

Railway stations in Cuttack district
Khurda Road railway division